The 22nd American Society of Cinematographers Awards were held on January 26, 2008, honoring the best cinematographers of film and television in 2007.

Winners and nominees

Film
Outstanding Achievement in Cinematography in Theatrical Release
  There Will Be Blood – Robert Elswit
 The Assassination of Jesse James by the Coward Robert Ford – Roger Deakins
 Atonement – Seamus McGarvey
 The Diving Bell and the Butterfly (Le scaphandre et le papillon) – Janusz Kamiński
 No Country for Old Men – Roger Deakins

Television
Outstanding Achievement in Cinematography in Miniseries, Pilot, or Movies of the Week
  The Company – Ben Nott
 Bury My Heart at Wounded Knee – David Franco
 Jesse Stone: Sea Change – Rene Ohashi
 Pushing Daisies – Michael Weaver (Episode: "Pie-lette")
 Raines – Oliver Bokelberg (Episode: "Pilot")

Outstanding Achievement in Cinematography in Episodic TV Series
  Smallville – Glen Winter (Episode: "Noir")
 The Black Donnellys – Russell Lee Fine (Episode: "All of Us Are in the Gutter")
 CSI: Crime Scene Investigation – James L. Carter (Episode: "Ending Happy")
 CSI: Miami – Eagle Egilsson (Episode: "Inside Out")
 Women's Murder Club – John Fleckenstein (Episode: "Welcome to the Club")

References

2007
2007 film awards
2007 television awards
2007 awards in the United States
2007 guild awards